Meta Kušar (born 10 May 1952) is a Slovene poet and essayist.

Kušar was born in Ljubljana in 1952. She studied Slovene language and literature at the University of Ljubljana and is best known for her poetry.

In 2012 she received the Rožanc Award for her collection of essays Kaj je poetično ali ura ilegale.

Published works

 Madeira, poetry (1993)
 Svila in Lan (Silk and Flax), poetry (1997)
 Ljubljana, poetry (2004)
 Kaj je poetično ali ura ilegale (What is Poetic or the Hour of the Underground), essays (2011)
 Jaspis, poetry (2008)
 Intervju, interview (2009)
 Vrt, poetry (2014)
 Azur/Himmelblau, poetry (2015)  
 Zmaj, poetry (2021)

References

Slovenian women poets
Slovenian poets
Slovenian essayists
Living people
1952 births
Writers from Ljubljana
University of Ljubljana alumni
Slovenian women essayists
20th-century Slovenian women writers
20th-century Slovenian writers
21st-century Slovenian women writers
21st-century Slovenian writers